Melville John Galley (8 March 1948 – 1 July 2008) was an English guitarist, singer and songwriter, best known for his work with Whitesnake, Trapeze, Finders Keepers and Phenomena.

Galley was born in Cannock, Staffordshire, England. While a member of Whitesnake, he badly injured his arm in an accident at a fairground in Germany and had to leave the band, as he was unable to play the guitar because of nerve damage as a result of incompetent surgery. Later he became known for playing with "The Claw", a specially developed spring and wire device fitted to his hand which enabled him to play the guitar again. Together with his brother Tom Galley and Wilfried Rimensberger, he was a founding member of Phenomena where his songwriting and guitar playing skills had a major impact on its success.

On 7 February 2008 Galley revealed that he was suffering from esophageal cancer, and had only a short time to live.

Galley died on 1 July the same year at the age of 60.

Discography

With Finders Keepers
"Sadie, The Cleaning Lady" (single)

With Trapeze
Trapeze
Medusa
You Are the Music...We're Just the Band
The Final Swing
Hot Wire
Live At The Boat Club
Trapeze
Hold On a.k.a. Running
Live in Texas: Dead Armadillos
Welcome to the Real World
High Flyers: The Best of Trapeze
Way Back to the Bone
On the Highwire

With Glenn Hughes
Play Me Out

With Whitesnake

Saints & Sinners (Vocals only)
Slide It In
Live In 1984: Back To The Bone (2014)

With Phenomena
Phenomena (Bronze 1985)
Phenomena II "Dream Runner" (RCA 1987)
Phenomena III "Inner Vision"
Psychofantasy (Escape 2006)
Blind Faith (Escape 2010)

With Cozy Powell
Octopuss

References

External links
Guardian obituary
Glenn Hughes' Trapeze page

English rock guitarists
Whitesnake members
Trapeze (band) members
Finders Keepers (band) members
1948 births
2008 deaths
People from Cannock
Deaths from esophageal cancer
20th-century British guitarists